Tychicus longipes is a spider species native to Amboina (Indonesia) and introduced in the Netherlands.

See also
 List of Sparassidae species

References

Sparassidae
Spiders of Europe
Spiders described in 1837
Endemic fauna of Indonesia
Spiders of Indonesia